Simplex Nthala (born 24 February 1988) is a Malawian footballer, who currently plays for GD Maputo in Mozambique.

International career
He played only one game for the Malawi national football team before being nominated for the 2010 African Cup of Nations in Angola. So far, he has collected 20 caps for national team.

References

1988 births
Living people
People from Blantyre
Malawian footballers
Malawi international footballers
2010 Africa Cup of Nations players
Malawian expatriate footballers
Expatriate footballers in Mozambique
Malawian expatriate sportspeople in Mozambique
Mighty Wanderers FC players
Liga Desportiva de Maputo players
Vilankulo F.C. players
Clube Ferroviário de Nampula players
C.D. Maxaquene players
Clube Ferroviário de Maputo footballers
GD Maputo players
Association football goalkeepers